Sree Perunthatta Siva Temple is an ancient Hindu temple dedicated to Lord Shiva is situated in Guruvayur of Thrissur District in Kerala state in India. According to folklore, sage Parashurama has installed the idol of Lord Shiva in the Treta Yuga. The temple is a part of the 108 famous Shiva temples in Kerala. Therefore, the Saiva-Vaishnava glow is a holy abode.

History
This centuries old Shiva temple was under the direct rule of the Zamorin of Calicut. Bhaktasiromani Sundaramurthy Nayanar has written about this temple in the ancient Tamil script, Tirukova. It is one of the great temples that were destroyed during the Tipu's campaign. It is said that the devotees returned to Ambalapuzha with the idol of Guruvayoorappan just before thistemple was destroyed. Perundatta Mahadeva Temple is located on the south western side of the Guruvayur Temple. 
Many stone inscriptions are found in the temple complex. Recently, excavations from the temple have uncovered evidence that the Zamorin's forces tried to defend Tipu. When excavating the temple, two large cannons were found. The history of these two cannons dates back to the 18th century.  The palace of the Zamorin Raja is located near the Perundatta temple at western side.

Temple, Architecture 
This is one of the oldest temples of Thrissur district and centuries old in Cochin kingdom. The temple is located in the Guruvayur town, south-western side of the Guruvayur temple. The temple is very beautiful and built like a maha temple. The Sanctum Sanctorum is double storey with its majestic proportions it shows the Kerala temple architectural style. The Sanctum Sanctorum is tile roofed with rectangular shape. Perunthatta temple has about 2 acres of land. It has built a large edifice around it. The tranquil and serene atmosphere of the village can be seen on all four sides of temple.

Sub Deities
 Ganapathy
 Vishnu
 Subrahmanyan
 Durga
 Nagaraja
 Sastha
 Rakshas

References

108 Shiva Temples
Shiva temples in Kerala
Hindu temples in Thrissur district